John Patrick Stephenson (born 14 March 1965) is an English former first-class cricketer, who is currently CEO at Essex County Cricket Club.

The cricket writer, Colin Bateman, commented on Stephenson's Test match appearance, "by the time John Stephenson was picked in 1989, England's selection policy resembled one of those bingo machines in which numbered balls are blown up a tube at random".  Bateman added, "Stephenson, an intelligent, useful all-round cricketer, became player No. 29 used by England in a shambolic series – a post-war record".

Life and career
He was educated at Felsted School and Durham University. While an undergraduate he was awarded a palatinate for cricket in 1986. He had a long county cricket career as a right-handed batsman and a right-arm medium bowler for Essex (1985–1994 and 2002–2004) and Hampshire (1995–2001). He also captained Hampshire between 1996 and 1997. He helped Essex win the County Championship in 1986, 1991 and 1992. 

Stephenson was a One Test Wonder, playing only one Test match against Australia at The Oval in 1989, opening the batting alongside Essex colleague Graham Gooch. His call up was assisted by a timely century for an England XI against a Netherlands XI a week before his Test Match. Later in his career he was twice picked to tour with the England A team (to Zimbabwe in 1989–90 and West Indies in 1991–92). He enjoyed some success as a bowler on the latter tour, taking 5 for 53 in the third unofficial "Test". He was also part of the England squad which won the Hong Kong Sixes tournament in 1993.

He was appointed Head of Cricket at the MCC in mid-2004, and thereafter appeared only in a handful of MCC matches. He was responsible for MCC's playing and touring programmes, the strategic management of the playing and practice areas at Lord's, and supervision of the MCC Young Cricketers programme. Stephenson left MCC and took up the role of CEO at Essex County Cricket Club in October 2021.

See also
One Test Wonder

References

External links
 

1965 births
People educated at Felsted School
Living people
Boland cricketers
England Test cricketers
English cricketers
Essex cricketers
Hampshire cricket captains
Hampshire cricketers
Marylebone Cricket Club cricketers
People from Stebbing
Sportspeople from Essex
British Universities cricketers
Test and County Cricket Board Under-25s XI cricketers
Alumni of the College of St Hild and St Bede, Durham
English cricket administrators